A creative trip is a trip whose purpose is to bring an inspiration or information for a creative work.

Soviet Union
In the Soviet Union, creative trips were a kind of business trips for creative workers (writers, artists, etc.) with expenses paid by Soviet creative unions.

References

Soviet culture
Types of travel